Bernau-Friedenstal (in German Bahnhof Bernau-Friedenstal) is a railway station in the city of Bernau bei Berlin, Germany. It is served by the Berlin S-Bahn.

References

External links

 Station information

Berlin S-Bahn stations
Railway stations in Brandenburg
Buildings and structures in Barnim